The Nandi Stakes is a Canadian Thoroughbred horse race run annually during the last week of July or first week of August at Woodbine Racetrack in Toronto, Ontario. An Ontario Sire Stakes, it is a restricted race for two-year-old fillies. A six-furlong sprint raced on Polytrack synthetic dirt, the Nandi Stakes currently carries a purse of $95,488.

The race was first run in 1975 and named to honor the filly Nandi, dam of Windfields. Since inception, it has been contested at various distances.
 5 furlongs : 2006
 5.5 furlongs : 1976-1979 
 6 furlongs : 1975, 1980-2005, 2007–present

In 1979, the Nandi Stakes was run in two divisions.

Records
Speed  record: 
 1:09.64 - Tree Pose (2010) (at current distance of six furlongs)

Most wins by an owner:
 3 - Kinghaven Farms (1976, 1982, 1984)
 3 - Sam-Son Farm (1983, 1986, 1990)

Most wins by a jockey:
 4 - Patrick Husbands (2000, 2002, 2003, 2014)

Most wins by a trainer:
 3 - James E. Day (1983, 1986, 1990)

Winners

References
 The 2009 Nandi Stakes at About.com, a part of The New York Times Company

Ontario Sire Stakes
Ungraded stakes races in Canada
Flat horse races for two-year-olds
Recurring sporting events established in 1975
Woodbine Racetrack
1975 establishments in Ontario